Anisaspis is a genus of baldlegged spiders that was first described by Eugène Louis Simon in 1892.  it contains only two species, found only in Colombia and on the Windward Islands: A. camarita and A. tuberculata.

See also
 List of Paratropididae species

References

Mygalomorphae genera
Paratropididae
Spiders of the Caribbean